Gabriel Berdugo (born 26 November 1947) is a Colombian footballer. He competed in the men's tournament at the 1968 Summer Olympics.

References

External links
 
 
 

1947 births
Living people
Colombian footballers
Colombia international footballers
Olympic footballers of Colombia
Footballers at the 1968 Summer Olympics
Sportspeople from Barranquilla
Association football midfielders
América de Cali footballers
Atlético Junior footballers
Unión Magdalena footballers
Once Caldas footballers
20th-century Colombian people